The 2015 UCLA Bruins men's soccer team represented The University of California, Los Angeles during the 2015 NCAA Division I men's soccer season. It was the 80th season of the university fielding a program.

Schedule 

|-
!colspan=6 style="background:#0073CF; color:gold;"| Preseason
|-

|-
!colspan=6 style="background:#0073CF; color:gold;"| Regular Season
|-

|-

References 

Ucla Bruins
UCLA Bruins men's soccer seasons
Ucla Bruins
Ucla Bruins